Jainosaurus  is a genus of titanosaurian sauropod dinosaur of India and wider Asia, which lived in the Maastrichtian (approximately 68 million years ago). No accurate estimate of the length, height, or weight has yet been made. The humerus of the type specimen is 134 centimetres long.

Etymology

The specific name of J. septentrionalis means "northern" in Latin, a reference to the fact that the species was discovered on the Northern hemisphere whereas Antarctosaurus means "saurian from the Southern hemisphere" because its type species Antarctosaurus wichmannianus was found in Argentina. The generic name honours the Indian paleontologist Sohan Lal Jain, who worked on the cranial nerve impressions in the skull; and in 1982 published a study about the results. Ironically, Jain himself considered the remains synonymous with Titanosaurus in the 1997 description of Isisaurus. However, Wilson and Upchurch (2003) rejected the synonymy of Jainosaurus and Titanosaurus due to the dubious status of the latter.

History
The type species of Jainosaurus, J. septentrionalis has a long and complex taxonomic history closely connected to the history of the problematic genera Titanosaurus and Antarctosaurus. The first known remains attributable to Jainosaurus, the humerus GSI K22/754, was discovered in 1871 or 1872 by Henry Benedict Medlicott, and the holotype remains were found by Charles Alfred Matley between 1917 and 1920 near Jabalpur in the Lameta Formation. These were named Antarctosaurus septentrionalis by Friedrich von Huene and Matley in 1933.

In 1995 Hunt et al., believing Antarctosaurus to belong to Dicraeosauridae, made the clearly titanosaurian Antarctosaurus septentrionalis the type species of a new genus, Jainosaurus, and determined that the braincase, GSI IM K27/497, should be the lectotype. Jainosaurus was further distinguished from Antarctosaurus by details of the braincase.

In 2009, Jeffrey Wilson and others made a detailed reassessment of Jainosaurus septentrionalis and confirmed its validity. The postcrania, which had been assumed lost, were shown to be largely present in the collection of the Geological Survey of India at Calcutta. They include: dorsal rib fragments (GSI K20/326, K27/425); a caudal vertebra (GSI K20/317), four chevrons (GSI K27/492–494, 496), the left and right scapula (only a cast still extant); a sternal plate (GSI K20/647); a humerus (lacking an inventory number), a radius (GSI K27/490) and an ulna (GSI K27/491). In 1996 Sankar Chatterjee referred a second braincase to the species: ISI R162. Some material from Pakistan also possibly belongs to Jainosaurus.

Wilson e.a. concluded that Jainosaurus is a valid taxon, clearly distinguishable from Isisaurus. It would have been a fairly derived member of the Titanosauria, more closely related to South American forms like Pitekunsaurus, Muyelensaurus and Antarctosaurus than to Isisaurus or Rapetosaurus.

References

Titanosaurs
Late Cretaceous dinosaurs
Dinosaurs of India and Madagascar
Fossil taxa described in 1995
Taxa named by Martin Lockley
Taxa named by Spencer G. Lucas